Chhata  is a tehsil in Mathura district of Uttar Pradesh state, India. Its headquarters is Chhata town. It is part of Agra division. It is located 35 km north of the District headquarters Mathura, and 413 km east of the state capital Lucknow.

List of towns and villages

References

External links 
Villages & Towns in Chhata Tehsil of Mathura, Uttar Pradesh

Mathura district
Tehsils of Uttar Pradesh